Fabio Ide (born December 26, 1983) is a Brazilian actor and model in Philippines. Ide is in at D'Survivors with Akihiro Sato and Daniel Matsunaga.

Early life
A native of São Paulo, Brazil, Fabio Ide was born on 26 December 1983 to Ana Maria Ide and Luis Ide. His mother is a Brazilian of Portuguese, African, and Indigenous descent, while his father is Japanese Brazilian. He has two sisters. Ide attended Mackens University where he pursued a degree in publicity and marketing.

Football career
Ide signed up to play for Team Socceroo F.C. of the now-defunct United Football League for the 2011 season. He played with fellow model actor Daniel Matsunaga with the club.

Filmography

Television

Drama anthology

Movies

References

External links 
 

Living people
1987 births
Association footballers not categorized by position
Brazilian actors
Brazilian expatriate footballers
Brazilian expatriate sportspeople in the Philippines
Brazilian footballers
Brazilian male actors
Brazilian male models
Brazilian people of Japanese descent
Male actors of Japanese descent
People from São Paulo
Team Socceroo F.C. players
GMA Network personalities
Viva Artists Agency
Footballers from São Paulo (state)